Yugoslavia made their penultimate Eurovision entry in the Eurovision Song Contest 1991, held in Rome, Italy.

Before Eurovision

Jugovizija 1991 
The Yugoslav national final to select their entry was held on 9 March 1991 at TV Studio A in Sarajevo, and was hosted by Draginja Balać and Senad Hadžifejzović. The formal name of the contest was "JRT izbor za pjesmu Evrovizije – Sarajevo '91". There were 16 songs in the final, from all subnational public broadcasters. This was the final Jugovizija participation for the broadcasters in Croatia, Macedonia and Slovenia before declaring independence later in the same year.

The winner was chosen by the votes of eight regional three-member juries, one jury for each of the subnational public broadcasters of JRT. At least two professionals within the music industry, and one under age of 30. Each of the jurors, 24 in total, gave points to their favorite songs according to a system with the ascending format of going from 1–3, 5 and finally 7 points. The subnational public broadcasters could vote for their own entries. The winning entry was "Brazil", performed by Serbian singer Bebi Dol, composed by Zoran Vračević and written by Bebi Dol herself.

Jury members
 HTV, Zagreb: Mirna Berend (chairperson), Stipica Kalogjera, Danijela Bilbija, Ivica Krajač
 TVBg, Belgrade: Majda Ropret (chairperson), Boba Stefanović, Katarina Gojković, Laza Ristovski
 TVPr, Prishtina: Mirjana Bojović (chairperson), Anđela Karaferić, Dragan Nikolić, Ljiljana Đorđević
 TVSl, Ljubljana: Miša Molk (chairperson), Nino Robič, Tomaž Dobicelj, Tanja Ribič
 TVSa, Sarajevo: Mirjana Potpara (chairperson), Fadil Redžić, Jadranka Crnogorac, Anton Josipović
 TVSk, Skopje: Svetlana Stojanovska (chairperson), Mario Lipša, Jana Andreevska, Stole Popov
 TVNS, Novi Sad: Hajnalka Buda (chairperson), Mladen Vranešević, Gordana Dean-Gačić, Jovan Adamov
 TVCG, Titograd: Melani Bulatović (chairperson), Goran Pejović, Aco Đukanović, Rade Keković

At Eurovision
Bebi Dol was the first performer on the night of the Contest, preceding Iceland. At the close of the voting the song had received only 1 point, coming 21st in the field of 22 competing countries, beating only Austria. The Yugoslav jury awarded its 12 points to Israel.

Voting

Notes

References

External links
Eurodalmatia official ESC club
Eurovision Song Contest National Finals
Eurovision France
ECSSerbia.com
OGAE North Macedonia

1991
Countries in the Eurovision Song Contest 1991
Eurovision